Edelin is a surname. Notable people with the surname include:

 Benjamin Edelin (born 1993), French track cyclist
 Kenneth C. Edelin (1939–2013), American physician
 Kenton Edelin (born 1962), American basketball player
 Ramona Edelin (born 1945), American academic, activist, and consultant